Alam Mir (born 1944) is a former Afghanistan wrestler, who competed at the 1972 Summer Olympics in the bantamweight event.

References

External links
 

Wrestlers at the 1972 Summer Olympics
Afghan male sport wrestlers
Olympic wrestlers of Afghanistan
1944 births
Living people
Place of birth missing (living people)
Date of birth missing (living people)
20th-century Afghan people